El Naggaza National Park is a national park of Libya in the Murqub district close to Tripoli.

Flora and fauna
The park hosts various species of birds such as flamingos and seagulls, as well as other species of animals such as seals.

External links
 Worldatlas
 Protected Planet
 Worlds National Parks

References

National parks of Libya
Protected areas established in 1993